The 1951 Amateur World Series was the twelfth Amateur World Series (AWS), an international men's amateur baseball tournament. The tournament was sanctioned by the International Baseball Federation (which titled it the Baseball World Cup as of the 1988 tournament). The tournament took place, for the only time, in Mexico, from November 1 to 19.

Cuba fared well in the preliminary round, going 9-1 with a one-run loss to Puerto Rico. Venezuela also was 9-1, followed by Puerto Rico (7-3) and the Dominican Republic (7-3). Failing to advance to round two were Nicaragua (6-4), Costa Rica (5-5), Panama (5-5), Colombia (4-6), Mexico (2-8), Guatemala (1-9), and El Salvador (0-10). 

In the final round, Puerto Rico went 3-0 to win the gold medal. Venezuela claimed the silver with a 2-1 mark, while Cuba was a disappointing 1-2; both losses were by 7-6 scores. The Dominican Republic was 0-3 in the medal round.

Bert Bradford of Nicaragua led the tourney with a .481 average and 25 hits, while the Dominicans had the top home run threat, Walter James, with 3. Puerto Rico's Sotero Ortiz led in runs (21) and stolen bases (10) while teammate Ramon Maldonado hit 8 doubles, the most.

Final standings

Baseball World Cup
International baseball competitions hosted by Mexico
Amat
1951 in Mexican sports
November 1951 sports events in North America
Sports competitions in Mexico City
1950s in Mexico City
November 1951 events in Mexico